, Latin for "of the king", occurs in numerous English place names. The name usually recalls the historical ownership of lands or manors by the Crown. In other places it honours royal associations rather than ownership. The "Regis" form was often used in the past as an alternative form to "King's", for instance at King's Bromley and King's Lynn.

Examples in England

Bedfordshire

Houghton Regis

Devon

Salcombe Regis

Dorset

Bere Regis 
Lyme Regis
Melcombe Regis
Wyke Regis

Essex

Hatfield Regis, now Hatfield Broad Oak

Gloucestershire

Barton Regis Hundred, which historically included the county of Bristol

Kent

Milton Regis

Norfolk

Beeston Regis

Northamptonshire

Grafton Regis

Oxfordshire 

Letcombe Regis

Somerset

Brompton Regis
Kingsbury Regis

Warwickshire

Newton Regis

West Midlands

Rowley Regis
Tettenhall Regis, Wolverhampton

West Sussex

Bognor Regis – In 1929 George V, having spent  months recuperating from a serious illness in the seaside resort, allowed it the Regis addition.

Examples in other countries

Brazil
Lebon Régis
Pedro Régis

See also
List of place names with royal patronage in the United Kingdom

References

English toponymy